Syed Ahmed may refer to:
 Syed Ahmed (businessman) (born 1974), British entrepreneur, businessman, contestant on The Apprentice
 Syed Ahmed (politician) (1945–2015), Indian politician
 Syed Ahmad Khan (1817–1898), Indian educator, politician, Islamic reformer and modernist
 Syed Ahmad Barelvi or Sayyid Ahmed Raibarelvi (1786–1831), Indian religious Islamic martyr
 Syed Anwar Ahmed (born 1991), Indian television actor and film producer
 Syed Haris Ahmed (born 1984), convicted U.S. conspirator linked to a 2006 Toronto terrorism case
 Syed Imran Ahmed (born 1962), Pakistani politician
 Syed Ishtiaq Ahmed (1932–2003), Bangladeshi lawyer and constitutionalist
 Syed Jamil Ahmed, Bangladeshi scholar and theatre director
 Syed Mobeen Ahmed, Pakistani politician
 Syed Mohammad Ahmed (born 1957), Pakistani screenwriter, lyricist, actor and director
 Syed Khaled Ahmed (born 1992), Bangladeshi cricketer
 Syed Khalid Ahmed (born 1965), Pakistani politician
 Syed Shoaib Ahmed (born 1996), Indian football striker
 Syed Sultan Ahmed (1880–1963), Indian barrister and politician
 Syed Imtiaz Ahmed (1954–2020), Indian cricketer
 Syed Refat Ahmed, justice of the Bangladesh Supreme Court
 Syed Samsuddin Ahmed, academic from Bangladesh